József Mészáros (16 January 1923 – 21 April 1997) was a Hungarian footballer and football manager.

External links
 

1923 births
1997 deaths
Hungarian footballers
Hungary international footballers
Hungarian football managers
Hungarian expatriate football managers
Budapest Honvéd FC players
Beşiktaş J.K. managers
Ferencvárosi TC footballers
Budapest Honvéd FC managers
Ferencvárosi TC managers
Győri ETO FC managers

Association football forwards
Nemzeti Bajnokság I managers